The sport of football in the country of Bahrain is run by the Bahrain Football Association, and is by far, the most popular sport in the country.

Bahrain has its own top-tier domestic professional football league, the Bahraini Premier League. It features 10 football clubs that play a two-round robin set, with each team playing a total of 18 fixtures. The winners of the domestic championship qualify for the AFC Cup.

The league uses a promotion and relegation system with the Bahraini Classification League, Bahrain's second-tier football league. The season usually starts in September and concludes in May, as in other football leagues. The first season was held in 1952. Although games are played on a home and away basis, almost all games are played at the Bahrain National Stadium.

The bottom placed club is relegated with the team finishing second bottom entering a relegation/promotion playoff match. The most successful club in the league's history is Al-Muharraq SC.

Total championships
As of 2019–20 season.

League system

National Team

Baharian best achievement was reaching the semi finals of the 2004 AFC Asian Cup.

Bahrain football venues

See also
Sport in Bahrain
Bahrain national football team

References